Green socialist can refer to the movement or ideology Green socialism (see Eco-socialism) or to any of the following:

Socialist Resistance, a British ecosocialist network
Socialist Environment and Resources Association, an organization affiliated with the UK Labour Party
Socialist Green Unity Coalition, a former UK electoral alliance
Third International Theory, a type of socialist government ("Jamahariya") written in Muammar Gaddafi's Green Book.